Denizli station is the main railway station in Denizli, Turkey. The Turkish State Railways operates three train services to Denizli; the daily Pamukkale Express to Eskişehir, the Basmane-Denizli Regional to Izmir with six daily trains and the daily Söke-Denizli Regional to Söke. It is located on the same street with Denizli Bus Terminal.

The station is on the southern end of the short  Goncalı-Denizli railway, which connects the city to the Izmir-Eğirdir railway.

Bus connections
Denizli Ulaşım
 120 - Karşıyaka - Valilik - Kervansaray
 121 - Karşıyaka - Valilik - Çınar
 130 - Teleferik - Çınar
 150 - Otogar - Ulus Cad. - Kampüs
 160 - 3.Sanayi - Kayıhan
 170 - Otogar - Sokak Hayvanları Kliniği
 191 - Otogar - Cankurtaran
 210 - Valilik - Pınarkent
 211 - Valilik - Güzelköy Kavşağı
 220 - Toki - Çınar - Aktepe
 230 - Otogar - Pamukkale
 240 - Otogar - Kale - Kocadere
 250 - Eskihisar - Çamlık - Kampüs
 251 - Eskihisar - Lise
 260 - Otogar - Bozburun - Salihağa
 270 - Valilik - Irlıganlı - Eldenizli
 300 - Karahasanlı - Üniversite - Bağbaşı
 301 - Karahasanlı - Hal Kavş. - Çınar
 360 - Otogar - Lise-Babadağ Toki
 420 - Otogar - Üzerlik - Aşağışamlı
 440 - Valilik-Gümüşler - Servergazi Hast.
 530 - Otogar - Yenişehir
 800 - Otogar - Çınar - Akkonak
 801 - Otogar - Hastane - Gezekyatağı

References 

Railway stations in Denizli Province
Railway stations opened in 1889
Denizli